Artur Brzozowski (born March 29, 1985) is a Polish race walker. He set a personal best time of 3:50:07 by finishing second for the 50 km race walk at the 2010 European Athletics Walking Meeting in Dudince, Slovakia.

Brzozowski represented Poland at the 2008 Summer Olympics in Beijing, where he competed for the men's 50 km race walk, along with his teammates Grzegorz Sudoł and Rafał Fedaczyński. Unfortunately, Brzozowski received a final warning (a total of three red cards) for not following the proper form during the 20 km lap, and was subsequently disqualified from the competition.

In 2021, Brzozowski participated in the men's 50 kilometres walk at the 2020 Summer Olympics in Tokyo, placing 12th and setting a new season best.

References

External links

NBC Olympics Profile

Polish male racewalkers
Living people
Olympic athletes of Poland
Athletes (track and field) at the 2008 Summer Olympics
Athletes (track and field) at the 2016 Summer Olympics
People from Podkarpackie Voivodeship
1985 births
People from Nisko
Sportspeople from Podkarpackie Voivodeship
Athletes (track and field) at the 2020 Summer Olympics
20th-century Polish people
21st-century Polish people